Charles H. Thomas (June 23, 1934 – September 13, 1998) was an American diplomat who served as ambassador to Hungary from 1990 to 1994, and as special U.S. envoy to the former Yugoslavia before his retirement in 1995.

Thomas was born in Buffalo, New York on June 23, 1934. He graduated from Harvard University before serving as a helicopter pilot in the Navy from 1956 to 1959. He then served in the Navy Reserve until 1972, retiring with the rank of lieutenant commander.

Thomas, a resident of Annapolis, Maryland, traveled to Manhattan for experimental medical treatment at Memorial Sloan Kettering Cancer Center for leukemia. He died there on September 13, 1998, at the age of 64.

References

1934 births
1998 deaths
Ambassadors of the United States to Hungary
Deaths from leukemia
Harvard University alumni
People from Annapolis, Maryland
People from Buffalo, New York